Oxyper is a Solvay coated and stabilised sodium carbonate peroxyhydrate (or sodium percarbonate) which combines the properties of sodium carbonate and hydrogen peroxide.  It is an odorless, crystalline, white powder used, when dissolved in water, in cleaning and bleaching applications and as a beer keg and line cleaner.  It is a brand name of the Solvay S.A. Corporation, headquartered in Brussels.

External links
Sodium Percarbonates, Solvay Corporation website, retrieved 2012-12-14
Product Data Sheet, retrieved 2012-12-14

Household chemicals
Antiseptics
Bleaches